Alive is a 1974 book by the British writer Piers Paul Read documenting the events of Uruguayan Air Force Flight 571.

Story

Alive tells the story of an Uruguayan rugby team (who were alumni of Stella Maris College), and their friends and family who were involved in the airplane crash of Uruguayan Air Force Flight 571. The plane crashed into the Andes mountains on Friday 13 October 1972. Of the 45 people on the flight, only 16 survived in sub-zero temperatures. After numerous days spent searching for survivors, the rescue team was forced to end the search. Consequently, the survivors had to sustain life with rations found in the wreckage after the plane had crashed. The rations did not last long, and in order to stay alive it became necessary for the survivors to eat the bodies of the dead. This was possible because the bodies had been preserved with the freezing temperatures and the snow. The book was published two years after the survivors of the crash were rescued. The author interviewed many of the survivors as well as the family members of the passengers before writing this book to obtain facts about the crash. He wanted to write the story as it had happened without embellishment or fictionalizing it. The author comments on this process in the "Acknowledgments" section:

I was given a free hand in writing this book by both the publisher and the sixteen survivors.  At times I was tempted to fictionalize certain parts of the story because this might have added to their dramatic impact but in the end I decided  that the bare facts were sufficient to sustain the narrative...when I returned in October 1973 to show them the manuscript of this book, some of them were disappointed by my presentation of their story.  They felt that the faith and friendship which inspired them in the cordillera do not emerge from these pages. It was never my intention to underestimate these qualities, but perhaps it would be beyond the skill of any writer to express their own appreciation of what they lived through.

Reception
The book was a critical success. Walter Clemons declared that it "will become a classic in the literature of survival."

Keith Mano of  The New York Times Book Review gave the book a "rave" review, stating that "Read's style is savage: unliterary, undecorated as a prosecutor's brief."  He also described the book as an important one:

Cowardice, selfishness, whatever: their essential heroism can weather Read's objectivity.  He has made them human.  'Alive' is thunderous entertainment: I know the events by rote, nonetheless I found it electric. And important.  'Alive' should be read by sociologists, educators, the Joint Chief of Staff. By anyone, in fact, whose business it is to prepare men for adversity.

Michel Roger concurs, stating that: "Read has risen above the sensational and managed a book of real and lasting value."

Editions
The first edition was released in 1974. A paperback which referenced the film Alive: The Miracle of the Andes, was released in 1993.  A new softcover edition, with a revised introduction and additional interviews with Piers Paul Read, Coche Inciarte, and Alvaro Mangino, was released by HarperCollins in 2005. This edition also has a new subtitle: Sixteen Men, Seventy-two Days, and Insurmountable Odds: The Classic Adventure of Survival in the Andes. The book was also re-released, simply titled Alive, in October 2012.

Films
 Survive! is a 1976 film adaptation of the story. 
 In 1993, Alive by Frank Marshall was released. A companion documentary, Alive: 20 Years Later, was made at the same time.

Music
The book inspired the song "The Plot Sickens" on the album Every Trick in the Book by the American metalcore band Ice Nine Kills.

References

External links
 Read, Piers Paul. Alive: The Story of the Andes Survivors - google books

1974 non-fiction books
Books about survival skills
Non-fiction books adapted into films
J. B. Lippincott & Co. books
Non-fiction books about cannibalism
Uruguayan Air Force Flight 571
Uruguayan biographies